Dora McGrath (born ) was  an American politician who was the first woman elected to the Wyoming State Senate in 1930.  Hailing from Thermopolis, she was elected as a Republican. McGrath, a resident of Thermopolis, Wyoming, represented Hot Springs County in the Senate.  She also served as a delegate from Wyoming to the 1932 Republican National Convention.

In April 1929, McGrath founded the Hot Springs County Pioneer Association.

References

Republican Party Wyoming state senators
Women state legislators in Wyoming
Date of death unknown
Year of birth unknown
Year of death unknown
20th-century American women politicians
20th-century American politicians
People from Thermopolis, Wyoming